Cadwaladr ap Cadwallon (also spelled Cadwalader or Cadwallader in English) was king of Gwynedd in Wales from around 655 to 682 AD. Two devastating plagues happened during his reign, one in 664 and the other in 682; he himself was a victim of the second. Little else is known of his reign.

The red dragon, long known as a Welsh symbol, appearing in the Mabinogion, the Historia Brittonum, and the stories of Geoffrey of Monmouth, has, since the accession of Henry VII to the English throne, often been referred to as "The Red Dragon of Cadwaladr". The association with Cadwaladr is a traditional one, without a firm historical provenance.

Though little is known about the historical Cadwaladr, he became a mythical redeemer figure in Welsh culture. He is a prominent character in the romantic stories of Geoffrey of Monmouth, where he is portrayed as the last in an ancient line to hold the title King of Britain. In Geoffrey's account, he does not die of plague. He renounces his throne in 688 to become a pilgrim, in response to a prophecy that his sacrifice of personal power will bring about a future victory of the Britons over the Anglo-Saxons. Geoffrey's story of Cadwaladr's prophecy and trip to Rome is believed to be an embellishment of the events in the life of Cædwalla of Wessex, whom Geoffrey mistakenly conflated with Cadwaladr. Cædwalla renounced his throne and travelled to Rome in 688.

For later Welsh commentators, the myth "provided a messianic hope for the future deliverance of Britain from the dominion of the Saxons". It was also used by both the Yorkist and Lancastrian factions during the Wars of the Roses to claim that their candidate would fulfil the prophecy by restoring the authentic lineage stemming from Cadwaladr.

Historical record

Cadwaladr was the son of a famous father, Cadwallon ap Cadfan, and the successor to King Cadafael. His name appears in the pedigrees of the Jesus College MS. 20 (as "Kadwaladyr vendigeit", or "Cadwaladr the Blessed").

Cadwaladr appears to have suffered a major military defeat at the hands of the West Saxons at Pinhoe near Exeter in 658. He is said to have been of a "peaceful and pious" temperament and to have patronised many churches. The church of Llangadwaladr in Anglesey identifies him as its founder.

Cadwaladr's name appears as 'Catgualart' in a section of the Historia Brittonum, where it says he died of a dreadful mortality while he was king. The great plague of 664 is not noted in the Annales Cambriae, but Bede's description makes clear its impact in both Britain and Ireland, where its occurrence is also noted in the Irish Annals. The plague of 682 is not noted by Bede, but the Annales Cambriae note its occurrence in Britain and that Cadwaladr was one of its victims. Both the Annales Cambriae and the Irish Annals note the plague's impact in Ireland in 683, as do other sources.

The genealogies in Jesus College MS. 20 and the Harleian genealogies give Cadwaladr as the son of Cadwallon and the father of Idwal Iwrch. Idwal, who fathered the later king Rhodri Molwynog, may have been his successor.

Early mythic significance
Cadwaladr's name is invoked in a number of literary works such as in the Armes Prydein, an early 10th-century prophetic poem from the Book of Taliesin. While the poem's "Cadwaladr" is an emblematic figure, scholars have taken the view that the Cadwaladr of Armes Prydein refers to the historical son of Cadwallon, and that already at this stage he "played a messianic role" of some sort, but "its precise nature remains uncertain". He is typically paired with Conan Meriadoc, the founder of British settlements in Brittany. Conan and Cadwaladr are identified as warriors who will return to restore British power. Armes Prydein says, "Spendour of Cadwaladr, shining and bright, defence of armies in desolate places. Truly he [Conan] will come across the waves, the promise of prophecy in the beginning." 

According to Elissa R. Henken, Cadwaladr was well established as a "prophesied deliverer" of the Britons before Geoffrey's version of his life altered its ending. This may be because he was seen as the man who would carry forward the achievement of his father Cadwallon, the last great war leader of the Britons: "it is quite likely that the father and son became confused in folk memory, a fusion enhanced by Cadwaladr, whose name is a compound meaning 'battle-leader', also having assumed his father's epithet Bendigaid (Blessed)."

Geoffrey of Monmouth

Cadwaladr figures prominently in Geoffrey of Monmouth's romantic account of the Historia Regum Britanniae. As such, the Cadwaladr of Geoffrey is a literary invention that used the name of a historical person to advance the plot of the story. In Book XII, Chapter XIV of the Historia, Cadwaladr is given as the last in a line of kings that began with Brutus of Troy. Chapters XV – XVIII have him leaving a depopulated Britain for Brittany, where the British people have resettled. Britain itself has been almost emptied by plague; for eleven years the country was "completely abandoned by all the Britons" except for parts of Wales. Cadwaladr is received as a guest by Alan Hir, King of Brittany.  Taking advantage of the depopulation, the Saxons invite more of their countrymen to join them as soon as the plague abates. From this point they become completely dominant in Britain, and the British come to be called the "Welsh".

At the same time, in Brittany, Cadwaladr intends to return to take back the island, and asks Alan to provide him with an army. The Breton king agrees, but Cadwaladr hears a prophetic voice which tells him that he must sacrifice personal power for the sake of his people. If he renounces the throne, his sacrifice will eventually lead to the restoration of British control of the island in the future, as predicted by Merlin to Vortigern: "the Voice added that, as a reward for its faithfulness, the British people would occupy the island again at some time in the future, once the appointed moment should come". Cadwaladr is told that if he lives a penitent life he will become a saint. His bones will be hidden to protect them. When his sacred bones are found and returned to Britain, the Britons (Welsh and Bretons) will be restored to full possession of their homeland. Cadwaladr and Alan then consult the prophecies of Merlin, and rejoice that this prediction will be fulfilled in future. He then travels to Rome as a pilgrim, where he dies in 689 after meeting the pope.

Thus Cadwaladr becomes a messianic figure who sacrifices himself to redeem his people and restore them to their promised homeland. Cadwaladr's penitence assures his sainthood. His son Ivor and his nephew Ynyr return to Britain with an army, but, as predicted, are not successful in restoring British control of the island.

In another passage in the book a list of Merlin's prophesies contains the prediction: 

This seems to correspond to the pairing of Cadwaladr and Conan as restorers of Britain in Armes Prydein. The merging of the Welsh and Breton peoples is linked to an alliance with "Alban" (which probably means Scotland: Alba). The occupation of the English will be at an end and Britain will be restored to its true identity as the territory of the descendants of Brutus of Troy.

Cadwaladr and the Wars of the Roses

During the Wars of the Roses the prophecies connected to Cadwaladr were used by various contenders as part of their claim to the throne. This was linked to the story of the struggle between the Red Dragon and the White Dragon, part of the myth of Merlin, interpreted as warring Celtic and Saxon peoples. Edward IV claimed to be restoring the authentic ancient lineage of Cadwaladr, thus fulfilling Merlin's prophecy of the victory of the red dragon. His chancellor gave a sermon asserting that "the British line, which perished with Cadwallader's exile in 689 was restored by the arrival of Edward the king prophesied by Merlin and others."

The Tudors also claimed descent from Cadwaladr to legitimize their authority over Britain as a whole. Owen Tudor claimed descent from Cadwaladr and used a red dragon badge. When Henry Tudor landed in Wales in 1485, he adopted the red dragon flag and claimed to be returning in fulfilment of the prophesies of Merlin as recorded by Geoffrey of Monmouth. After his victory at the Battle of Bosworth Field Henry was greeted at the gates of Worcester with a poem asserting,

Cadwallader's blood lineally descending,
Long hath be told of such a prince coming.
Wherefore friends, if that I shall not lie,
This same is the fulfiller of the prophesy.
 
The Welsh Dragon (Red Dragon) was thereafter referred to as the "Red Dragon of Cadwallader" and used as Henry's personal emblem. Tudor historian Thomas Gardiner created a genealogical roll that gave Henry's son, Henry VIII, a pedigree showing his descent from Cadwaladr, referred to as "the laste kynge of that blode from whome by trew and lynyall descensse" the Tudors descended.

Cadwaladr and Cædwalla
Geoffrey's account of the pilgrimage of Cadwaladr is believed to derive from a confusion between Cadwaladr and his near-contemporary Cædwalla of Wessex (reigned 685 – 688). He also conflates Cadwaladr's son Ivor with Cædwalla's successor Ine. According to Bede Cædwalla, king of Wessex, renounced his throne and went to Rome in 688 to be baptised by the pope, dying soon afterwards. Ine took the throne in 689.

The argument that Geoffrey confused Cadwaladr with Cædwalla acquired significance in the late 1570s. At that time, when St. Peter's in Rome was being rebuilt, the tombstone of Caedwalla was found, confirming Bede's story that he had died in Rome. Welshmen in Rome, seeking to validate Geoffrey, claimed that the tomb was that of Cadwaladr. This raised the prospect that his sacred bones could be returned to Britain in fulfilment of the prophecy.

The English critics stated that Geoffrey had simply mixed up the two kings, and that Cadwaladr's pilgrimage was thus pure fiction. According to Jason Nice, the Welsh "attempt to 'prove' the legend of Cadwaladr in Rome belonged to a longstanding tradition that held that Wales' special relationship with Rome could reinforce Welsh identity and protect Welshmen from English aggression", a belief that was grounded in the supposed prophecy given to Cadwaladr. Raphael Holinshed summed up the English view in his 1577 Chronicles of England, Scotland, and Ireland:

Also traced to Geoffrey's fertile imagination are stories of Ivor ap Alan and Ynyr travelling from Brittany to Britain. The choice of names for Ivor and Ynyr in the stories may be a consequence of spurious additions to the Laws of Edward the Confessor, which inaccurately speak of good relations between Wessex and the Welsh in the reign of King Ine of Wessex (reigned 688 – 726).

See also
Kings of Wales family trees

Notes

References 

682 deaths
Monarchs of Gwynedd
7th-century Welsh monarchs
Year of birth unknown